Vinnaithaandi Varuvaayaa is a 2010 Indian Tamil-language romantic drama film written and directed by Gautham Vasudev Menon, starring Silambarasan and Trisha. Jointly produced by Elred Kumar, Jayaraman, VTV Ganesh and P. Madan under the banner Escape Artists Motion Pictures and RS Infotainment, the film was distributed by Udhayanidhi Stalin's Red Giant Movies. The story was simultaneously shot in Telugu as Ye Maaya Chesave, starring Naga Chaitanya and Samantha, however, with a different cast.

Launched after a wave of publicity posters with no details about the cast and crew, Vinnaithaandi Varuvaayaa began its first schedule of filming in February 2009. Shooting continued through 2009, with the film garnering significant media interest, with schedules in Malta and the United States. Before release, it became the first Tamil project to have a music soundtrack premiere outside of India, with a successful launch at the British Academy of Film and Television Arts (BAFTAs) in London. The film features soundtrack composed by A. R. Rahman, cinematography by Manoj Paramahamsa and editing by Anthony Gonsalves.

Vinnaithaandi Varuvaayaa explores the complicated relationship between a Hindu Tamil boy, Karthik Sivakumar, and a Malayali Christian girl, Jessie from Alappuzha, Kerala. Karthik falls in love with Jessie only to be met by her indifference and reluctance as they belong to different religions and her strict conservative family will never consent to their union. The film released on 26 February 2010, along with the Telugu version to advance bookings worldwide. It was later remade in Hindi as Ekk Deewana Tha. A short film/sequel titled Karthik Dial Seytha Yenn, again directed by Menon with Silambarasan and Trisha reprising their roles, was released in May 2020.

Plot 
Karthik is a Mechanical Engineering graduate in Chennai with poor results who aspires to become a filmmaker instead of an engineer. His friend introduces him to Ganesh, a cinematographer. With Ganesh's help Karthik becomes an assistant to director. Karthik's family, who are Tamil Hindus, rent the bottom floor of Jessie's house. Jessie is from a conservative Malayali Nasrani Christian/Syrian Catholic family from Alappuzha, who lives upstairs.

Karthik falls in love with Jessie the moment he sees her on the street in front of their house. He tries to interact with Jessie, who is afraid of speaking to men around her strict father, and ends up angering her. Unable to hide his feelings any longer, Karthik confesses his love for her but she does not accept. A few days later, Karthik learns from his sister that Jessie has gone to Kerala to visit her grandmother. He and Ganesh end up in Kerala to look for her. After several days, he finds her and apologises. She introduces him to her family in Kerala as her "classmate". Jessie denies she has any feelings for him but agrees to only be his friend. However, on the train journey back home, Karthik purposely sits closely next to her and kisses her a few times but she eventually gently slaps him to make him stop. Karthik is convinced that Jessie loves him and repeatedly expresses his love towards her while she continues rejecting him by stating that her parents would not allow them to be together. She says that both of them are from different religious and ethnic backgrounds, and she is also a year older than him. The two meet several times and Jessie begins to realize that she also likes Karthik, but wants to refrain from any problems because she knows her father wouldn't accept the union. Eventually, due to various misunderstandings between Jessie's brother and Karthik, her parents learn of their supposed affair. They arrange for Jessie to be married to a different man and schedule her wedding. The wedding day arrives and midway through the ceremony, Jessie refuses to marry the groom, displeasing everyone in her family. Karthik, who had, without anyone's knowledge, come to Kerala to witness the wedding is ecstatic and secretly visits Jessie at her home. It is then that Jessie admits she has indeed fallen in love with him. Karthik and Jessie continue to see each other without the knowledge of their parents.

At this point of time, Karthik goes to Goa on a 45-day film shoot, where he gets rather busy. Meanwhile, the topic of Jessie's marriage comes up again at her home when the guy whom she refused to marry earlier pays them a visit. Panicking, Jessie calls Karthik and tells him that she wants to elope with him. Karthik, since he is traveling through less than ideal places, tells Jessie to stay in Chennai for now, and that soon he would be back and they can discuss. Jessie then stops taking Karthik's calls and so he goes back one night to check on Jessie. He learns that Jessie has decided to break up, as the relationship is not peaceful due to her parents' disapproval. She says she has agreed to marry a boy of their choice. When Karthik pleads her not to do it, she tells him that a time had come when she was willing to elope, but the moment was gone. She doesn't want Karthik to wait for her too long, as he has his dreams to fulfill. Karthik later learns that she is married and has settled in the UK.

Two years later, Karthik meets Nandini. She falls in love with him, but Karthik rejects her by saying that he hasn't yet gotten over Jessie. He then comes up with a script for his first film, which happens to be his very own love story and is shot in Tamil. He calls upon Naga Chaitanya as the film's protagonist, Nandini as the female lead and Ganesh as the film's cinematographer. The film is eventually titled "Jessie". While shooting for the film in New York, he sees Jessie and she comes to speak with him. Angry at her parents for not allowing her to be with Karthik, Jessie moves to New York. She admits that she is not married and is still in love with him, and he too says she is still in his heart. Karthik and Jessie spend time with each other around New York City. Karthik proposes yet again and they get married the same day. This is actually revealed to be the end scene in Karthik's film – which Karthik and Jessie in real life are watching together in the theatre. After the film ends, it is revealed to the audience that Jessie had in fact seen Karthik in New York but had not come forward to meet him. She is married now and hence asks Karthik to move on. She tells Karthik that they cannot lead a life which is full of obstacles as well as without parents' approval and hence they depart separately, to lead different lives and different destinies.

Cast 

 Silambarasan as Karthik Sivakumar, a Tamil Hindu and film director.
 Trisha as Jessie, a Syrian Catholic Malayali girl (Voice dubbed by Chinmayi)
 VTV Ganesh as Ganesh, a cinematographer
 Babu Antony as Joseph, Jessie's father
 Kitty as Sivakumar, Karthik's father
 Uma Padmanabhan as Mrs. Sivakumar, Karthik's mother
 Ranjith Velayudhan as Jerry, Jessie's brother (Voice dubbed by Gautham Vasudev Menon)
 Lakshmi Ramakrishnan as Teresa, Jessie's mother
 Trisha Alex as Anupama, Karthik's sister
 Benito as Roy Thomas
 Subbalakshmi as Jessie's grandmother
 K. S. Ravikumar as a Director
 Pradeep Kottayam as George, Jessie's uncle in Kerala
 Amit Mishra as Abraham
 Samantha in a cameo appearance as the actress Nandini
 Naga Chaitanya in a cameo appearance as himself

Production

Origin 
After making a series of action films, Gautham Vasudev Menon actively chose to make an "out and out love story" at the insistence of his close associates, and marked a return to the genre for the first time since Minnale (2001). Initially titled Vennilavae Vennillavae, inspired by the title of a song from Minsara Kanavu, Menon started writing the film as a simple love story which slowly became an intense love story, as the scripting phase progressed. Stating that the film would narrate the romantic tale of two people called Karthik and Jessie over a period of almost three years, he revealed that the film would be "conversation driven" and hoped "everybody will identify with the lead pair". Menon took the script to producer Manjula Ghattamaneni, who asked him to narrate the film to her brother Mahesh Babu and the movie was a Tamil and Telugu bilingual. Menon initially felt that the film would not suit the actor, but later agreed preliminary terms to make it in Telugu titled Jessie with the actor and have A. R. Rahman as the music composer, as he was impressed with the story.

Development 
Continuing from the earlier proposed theme of Vennilavae Vennillavae, Menon later chose to use the second line of the song to title his film as Vinnaithaandi Varuvaayaa, after it was suggested by the cinematographer Manoj Paramahamsa. Menon discussed a Tamil and Telugu version of the script with several actors including Dhanush, Jai and Allu Arjun who had wanted changes to be made to the climax, and described being "one week away" from starting the project with a debutant actor. But in late January 2009, Menon confirmed that he was in discussions with Silambarasan and Trisha to portray the lead roles from the script. After finding out that Silambarasan had dates available as a result of the delay in the shoot of Vignesh Shivan's Podaa Podi (2012), Menon chose to halt the production of his ongoing Chennaiyil Oru Mazhaikaalam and finalise pre-production work on Vinnaithaandi Varuvaayaa.

Menon added that Silambarasan was "apt for this kind of a film" and was "ready to experiment and try something different" from his usual film roles, prompting him to agree to star in the film. As Menon was working with Trisha on Chennaiyil Oru Mazhaikaalam, he chose to use her dates for Vinnaithaandi Varuvaayaa instead. To pique interest before the official announcement, the makers released a series of film posters featuring Silambarasan and Trisha inspired from previous classic Tamil films. The team used posters inspired from Geethanjali (1989), Minsara Kanavu (1997), Dil Se (1998), Alaipayuthey (2000) and Kaakha Kaakha (2003). Other members of the technical crew included Menon's regular collaborators editor Anthony, art director Rajeevan, costume designer Nalini Sriram and lyricist Thamarai. The project was jointly produced by Escape Artists Motion Pictures and RS Infotainment, with Elred Kumar, Ganesh, Madhan as producers.

Casting 
For the role of a mentor to Karthik's character, Menon first approached Vivek, but he turned down the opportunity. Later, one of the film's producers, Ganesh, was cast in the role, in what later became his breakthrough film as an actor. Chennai-based model Janani Iyer was recruited to portray the role of an assistant director who falls in love with Karthik, but the role was later reshot with Samantha, who worked as the lead actress of the film's Telugu version. Janani Iyer was subsequently seen in the background of several scenes where Karthik is shown to be a part of a film production team. Ashwin Kakumanu also auditioned for the role of Jessy's brother in the film and was selected, but eventually did not feature after having a clash of dates.

Filming 
Scenes were shot in the lakes of Alappuzha during April 2009 for a month, with the houseboats doubling up as caravans.

In May, the team moved to Malta to film the song sequences for "Hosanna" and "Omana Penne", choreographed by Flexy Stu. For the particular song sequences in the film, Menon wanted "churches, water and caves" and convinced the producers to finance a trip to Malta, and in the process, the team became the first South Indian film to shoot in the country. Scenes were shot in places including Valletta, Mdina, Gozo and Comino, as well as in lanes, alleys, eight churches and during the time of a village feast. The makers brought along a crew of twenty-six people to Malta, with ten local workers also helping on the production. The shoot lasted ten days and cost approximately €90,000.

In October 2009, the team flew to the United States to complete the final filming schedule. Scenes were shot throughout locations in Manhattan and New Jersey, with particular shots filmed at Brooklyn Bridge, Central Park and Times Square.

Soundtrack 

The soundtrack was composed by A. R. Rahman. Vinnaithaandi Varuvaayaa marked the beginning of a collaboration between Rahman, Silambarasan and Gautham Vasudev Menon.

The world premiere was held at BAFTA in London on 25 December 2009 and later it was relaunched in Chennai on 6 January 2010. The album consists of seven tracks. The audio received good pre-release response and was marked as No. 1 in Asia, in advance bookings. The album was ranked among the best musicals of 2010. It retained the same tunes for the Telugu version of the film, Ye Maaya Chesave and the Hindi remake, Ekk Deewana Tha.

Release 
The film was given a U/A certificate by the Indian Film Certification Board because, according to Menon, they believed "the love in the film was too intense for a child to understand".

Reception

Critical reception 
Oneindia.in said "The slow phase of the second half and frequent use of profane words (Chennai Tamil) are major minuses in Gautham's narration. But these are all not preventing one to enjoy the content of true and painful love of the film!"

Sify said that it was "Very good" further citing "The film is a must watch for those who cares for cinema of sense and substance. It stresses the fact that Tamil cinema has to break the mould if it aims to grab eyeballs. Gautham Menon has crafted a movie that will stay in our hearts for a long, long time." Indiaglitz stated "If and only if, you have all the time in the world, and you like the slow romantic genre, you'll enjoy this one."

Pavithra Srinivasan of Rediff.com called the film a "Must watch" further citing "The best part about VTV is that it revolves around people, rather than events. It's like putting a camera into the intimate, everyday life of two people and following them on their adventures. The characters go through a whirlwind of emotions, laugh and cry, and take you along with them." However, the reviewer points out certain drawbacks in the film citing "On the minus side, VTV suffers from the same defect as Vaaranam Aayiram: the second half lags in pace. The dialogues and confrontations are repetitive. There's a would-be love-track that seems unnecessary before the story takes off again."

Malathi Rangarajan from The Hindu said "Twenty two-year old Karthik's true-to-life overtures, reactions and recklessness are just as you would expect from a director of Menon's calibre. It is his authentic depiction of Jessie's confusion that's all the more amazing – Menon's complete understanding of a woman's psyche bowls you over! So do the young lovers!" Aravindan D. I. of nowrunning.com gave the film three stars out of five and said "Gautam Vasudev Menon's "Vinnaithaandi Varuvaaya" is a clean romantic story without any deviation or sub-plots."

Chennai Online said, Vinnaithaandi Varuvaayaa (VTV) is an excellent effort on the part of Gautam Vasudev Menon in narrating a clean romantic story without any deviation from the plot" and further cited "As is Menon’s forte, the dialogues and the execution of scenes are top-notch. The joys of falling of love and the pangs of separation have been portrayed well. The way Simbu nurtures his love for Jesse and the positive but ambiguous reactions from Trisha to his overtures are very nice indeed."

Raman Nalluswamy Thevar, an Indian author wrote an E-book titled "One Awesome Girl"  which narrates the dialogue "One-way ticket to Heart-break city" delivered by Simbu. Raman stated that his debut contains his auto-biography and semi-biography which received positive reviews.

Box office 
The film grossed  at the Chennai box office in the 12th weekend. It totally grossed  and was officially declared a blockbuster.

Accolades 
 Edison Awards
 Best Actor – Silambarasan Rajendar
 Best Actress – Trisha Krishnan
 Best Male Singer – Vijay Prakash

 Vikatan Awards
 Best Music Director – A. R. Rahman
 Best Male Singer – Benny Dayal
 Best Female Singer – Shreya Ghoshal
 Best Lyricist – Thamarai
 Best Costume Designer – Nalini Sriram

BIG Tamil Entertainment Awards

 Most Entertaining Actor – Silambarasan Rajendar
 Most Entertaining Male Singer – Vijay Prakash

 Vijay Music Awards

 Vijay Music awards – A. R. Rahman
 Vijay Music awards – Vijay Prakash
 Vijay Music awards – Shreya Ghoshal
 Vijay Music awards – Vinnaithaandi Varuvaayaa

 Vijay Awards
 Best Music Director – A. R. Rahman
 Best Male Playback Singer – Vijay Prakash
 Best Female Playback Singer – Shreya Ghoshal
 Favorite Heroine – Trisha Krishnan

 Filmfare Awards South

 Best Music Director – A. R. Rahman
 Best Lyricist – Thamarai (for "Mannipaaya")
 Best Cinematographer – Manoj Paramahamsa

Sequel 
In February 2018, Gautham Vasudev Menon announced a sequel to the film, titled Ondraga. This film will be a road movie – hyperlink film which will focus on Karthik and his best friends from college travelling to the United States to attend a wedding ten years after the events of the first film. Initially, Menon had stated R. Madhavan would be playing the role of an older Karthik. After Madhavan dropped out of the project, Silambarasan agreed to reprise the role he originally played. Trisha and Samantha Ruth Prabhu will also be reprising their roles from the first film. Tovino Thomas and Puneeth Rajkumar will be playing the roles as Karthik's Malayalam and Kannada friends respectively. Telugu actors Allu Arjun, Nani, Sai Dharam Tej, Varun Tej and Vijay Deverakonda have been approached to play the role of Karthik's Telugu friend. Actresses Tamannaah and Anushka Shetty are being considered as a third female lead.

The short film referring the characters Karthik and Jessie, titled Karthik Dial Seytha Yenn starring Silambarasan and Trisha was released on 21 May 2020.

In popular culture 
The dialogue "Inga Enna Solludhu" spoken by VTV Ganesh inspired a 2014 film of same name which was produced and acted by Ganesh. The sequence when Karthik (Silambarasan) leans on the gate when he is in love with Jessie in the song "Hosanna" is parodied by Santhanam in Neethaane En Ponvasantham (2012). The scene where Karthik proposes to Jessie is spoofed in Kannum Kannum Kollaiyadithaal (2020). In the film, Pratap (played by Gautham Vasudev Menon) gifts Jessie (played by Ritu Varma) a necklace. The scenes and dialogues were parodied in Tamizh Padam 2 (2018). The song "Omana Penne" inspired a film of the same name, but being titled as Oh Manapenne.

References

External links 
 

Films shot in Goa
Films shot in Malta
2010 multilingual films
2010 romantic drama films
Films shot in Kerala
Films shot in Alappuzha
Films set in Chennai
Films directed by Gautham Vasudev Menon
Indian interfaith romance films
2010 films
Tamil films remade in other languages
Films shot in New York City
Indian films set in New York City
2010s Tamil-language films
Films scored by A. R. Rahman
Indian romantic drama films
Indian multilingual films
Indian coming-of-age drama films
Films about filmmaking
Films about film directors and producers
2010s coming-of-age drama films